Marasmarcha bonaespei is a moth of the family Pterophoridae. It is known from Namibia and South Africa.

References

Exelastini
Moths of Africa
Insects of Namibia
Moths described in 1881